Spaceborne Hyperspectral Applicative Land and Ocean Mission (SHALOM) is a joint mission by the Israeli Space Agency and the Italian Space Agency to develop a hyperspectral satellite.

The mission was agreed upon in late 2010, and was originally intended to build two commercial hyperspectral satellites. Preliminary studies for the program started in 2012, with Phase A completed in 2013. A Joint Integrated Team from Italy and Israel perform preliminary definition and studies until 2014. By 2014, the project has evolved into building only one satellite. Phase B1 started in 2017 and was expected to last 12 months.

In October 2015 a memorandum of understanding was signed, and the system was slated to become fully operational in 2021, later pushed to 2022. As of December 2021, SHALOM is expected to be operational by 2025. The project is expected to cost over $200 million, with the cost being split evenly between the two countries.

Mission
The joint mission is expected to build a hyperspectral Earth observation satellite that will occupy the same orbit as the older Italian satellite, COSMO-SkyMed which was launched in 2007. The satellites will be equipped with instruments targeting the visible, infrared, and ultraviolet wavelengths in the 400 nm to 2700 nm range.

The satellite will use the OPTSAT-3000 satellite platform built by Israel Aerospace Industries, and is expected to be about 385 kg. The payload will be limited to 120 kg and is expected be equipped with:
 Panchromatic camera with a 2.5-m GSD,
 Commercial Hyper-spectral Imaging Spectrometer (0.2-2.5 µm)
 Infrared camera (4-12 µm)
 Spectral ranges (contiguous spectrum):
 Visible and near-infrared imaging spectrometers of 8 m in the 400-1010 nm range
 Short-wavelength infrared range imaging spectrometers of 10 m GSD in the 920–2700 nm range

The satellite is expected to launch in 2025 on a Vega launch vehicle.

See also
 Italian Space Agency
 Israel Space Agency

References

Earth observation satellites of Israel
Satellites of Italy
2025 in spaceflight